Lecuyer or L'Écuyer is a surname. Notable people with the surname include:

 Charlotte L'Écuyer (born 1943), Canadian politician
 Claude L'Écuyer (born 1947), Canadian politician
 Doug Lecuyer (born 1958), Canadian retired ice hockey player
 Gerald L'Ecuyer (born 1959), Canadian film and television director
 Gerard Lecuyer (born 1936), Canadian politician from Manitoba
 Jean Lécuyer, French track and field athlete
 John L'Écuyer (born 1966), Canadian film and television director

Occupational surnames
fr:L'Écuyer